Edward Burnaby Greene (c. 1735-1788) was an English landowner, poet, and translator. He inherited the Norland estate in modern-day Holland Park in 1740 from his paternal grandfather, Thomas Greene.

Four years after Greene's death, Benjamin Vulliamy purchased the Norland Estate for £4,270.

References

External links

1730s births
1788 deaths
Writers from London
English landowners
English male poets
English translators
English male non-fiction writers
18th-century British translators